Microdiplatys is an extinct genus of earwigs, in the family Protodiplatyidae. It is one of only six genera in the family, its family being the only one in the suborder.

Species
The genus contains only two known species:

 Microdiplatys campodeiformis
 Microdiplatys oculatus

References

External links
 The Tree of Life's article on Archidermaptera

Prehistoric insect genera
†Microdiplatys
Archidermaptera